Sarah Biffen (25 October 1784 – 2 October 1850), also known as Sarah Biffin, Sarah Beffin, or by her married name Mrs E. M. Wright, was a Victorian English painter born with no arms and only vestigial legs. She was born in 1784 in Somerset. Despite her disability she learned to read and write, and to paint using her mouth. She was apprenticed to a man named Dukes, who exhibited her as an attraction throughout England. In the St. Bartholomew's Fair of 1808, she came to the attention of George Douglas, the Earl of Morton, who went on to sponsor her to receive lessons from a Royal Academy of Arts painter, William Craig. The Society of Arts awarded her a medal in 1821 for a historical miniature and the Royal Academy accepted her paintings. The Royal Family commissioned her to paint miniature portraits of them. When the Earl of Morton died in 1827, Biffen was left without a noble sponsor and she ran into financial trouble. Queen Victoria awarded her a Civil List pension and she retired to a private life in Liverpool. She died on 2 October 1850 at the age of 66.

Early life
Sarah Biffen was born in 1784 to a family of farmers in East Quantoxhead, Somerset, with no arms and undeveloped legs – a result of the congenital condition phocomelia. Despite her disability she learned to read, and later was able to write using her mouth.

When she was around the age of 13, her family apprenticed her to a man named Emmanuel Dukes, who exhibited her in fairs and sideshows throughout England. At some point during the time, she learnt to paint holding the paint-brush in her mouth. During this period, she held exhibitions, sold her paintings and autographs, and took admission fees to let others see her sew, paint and draw. She drew landscapes or painted portrait miniatures on ivory with contemporaries praising her skill. Her miniatures were  sold for three guineas each, however, Biffen may have received as little as £5 a year while she was with Dukes.

Sponsorship and patronage

In the St. Bartholomew's Fair of 1808, George Douglas, the Earl of Morton wanted to see if Biffen could really paint unaided. Once he was convinced, he sponsored her to receive lessons from a Royal Academy of Arts painter, William Craig. The Society of Arts awarded her a medal in 1821 for a historical miniature and the Royal Academy accepted her paintings. The Royal Family commissioned her to paint miniature portraits of them, as a result of which she became very popular. She set up a studio in Bond Street, London. Charles Dickens mentioned her in Nicholas Nickleby, Martin Chuzzlewit, and Little Dorrit, and in "A Plated Article", when describing pottery figures spoiled in the firing process.

The Earl of Morton died in 1827. Without the support of a noble sponsor, Biffen ran into financial trouble when her manager used most of her money.  Queen Victoria awarded her a Civil List pension and she retired to a private life in Liverpool. On 6 September 1824, she married William Stephen Wright and later tried to renew her success with the name Mrs. Wright. The attempt was not successful but her supporters, including Richard Rathbone, arranged a public subscription to finance her for her final years.

Death
Sarah Biffen died on 2 October 1850 at the age of 66. She is buried in St James Cemetery in Liverpool.

Legacy
A self-portrait engraved by RW Sievier and published in London in June 1821 was sold at Sotheby’s in 1986 and again at Sotheby’s on 5 December 2019. The sale was of the collection of the late Dr Erika Pohl-Ströher. The auction estimate was £800–1200 but the final sale price was £137,500.

The first exhibition of Biffin’s work for 100 years Without Hands: the Art of Sarah Biffin, was held at the galleries of Philip Mould & Company, London in 2022.

See also
John Carter (mouth artist) (1815–1850), who was paralysed from below the neck after a fall.

References

External links

1784 births
1850 deaths
19th-century British women artists
19th-century English painters
19th-century English women
English amputees
English people with disabilities
English women painters
Mouth and foot painting artists
People from West Somerset (district)
People without hands
Sideshow performers
Artists with disabilities